National Route 429 is a national highway of Japan connecting Kurashiki, Okayama and Fukuchiyama, Kyoto in Japan, with a total length of 254.4 km (158.08 mi).

References

National highways in Japan
Roads in Hyōgo Prefecture
Roads in Kyoto Prefecture
Roads in Okayama Prefecture